Saint Castor of Apt (died ca. 420) was a bishop of Apt, in Gaul.  

He was born in Nîmes and may have been the brother of Saint Leontius of Fréjus.  Castor was a lawyer and married to a wealthy widow.  He lived in Marseilles.  His wife, however, allowed him to enter the religious life; she herself entered a nunnery.  Castor founded the monastery of Manauque (Monanque) in Provence which followed the monastic rule of John Cassian.  He was subsequently made bishop of Apt.   He died of natural causes.  

Saint John Cassian wrote the De institutis coenobiorum at the request of Castor. 

His feast day is September 2.  His relics are still preserved in the cathedral of Apt, of which he is one of the patrons.

References

External links
Catholic Online: Castor of Apt
Saints of September 2: Castor of Apt
 Saint Castor

420 deaths
Bishops of Apt
5th-century bishops in Gaul
People from Nîmes
5th-century Christian saints
Gallo-Roman saints
Year of birth unknown